The Canadian Airports Council (CAC) is the Canadian trade association for Canada's airports.  It is a division of Airports Council International-North America. 

Formed in 1991, as the devolution of airports to local control was beginning under Canada's National Airports Policy, the CAC has 54 airport operator members that represent more than 100 airports across Canada. These include all the non-governmental airports in Canada's National Airports System and other commercial airports in every province and territory.

Since 2011, Daniel-Robert Gooch has been the president of CAC in an Ottawa office with six full-time staff.

CAC members include the eight largest airports in Canada:
 Calgary Airport Authority, operator of Calgary International Airport
 Edmonton Regional Airports Authority, operator of Edmonton International Airport
 Halifax International Airport Authority, operator of Halifax Stanfield International Airport
Aéroports de Montréal, operator of Montréal-Trudeau International Airport and the International Aerocity of Mirabel
 Ottawa International Airport Authority, operator of Ottawa Macdonald-Cartier International Airport
Greater Toronto Airports Authority, operator of Toronto Pearson International Airport
 Vancouver Airport Authority, operator of Vancouver International Airport
 Winnipeg Airports Authority, operator of Winnipeg James Armstrong Richardson International Airport

References

External links 
 Canadian Airports Council
Airports Council International-North America

Airports in Canada
Aviation trade associations
Organizations established in 1991
1991 establishments in Canada
Aviation organizations based in Canada